Snowy Mountain is a stratovolcano on the Alaska Peninsula of Alaska, United States. It was named by the National Geographic Society in 1919 because of the extensive glaciers nearby.

References

Volcanoes of Lake and Peninsula Borough, Alaska
Stratovolcanoes of the United States
Volcanoes of Alaska
Mountains of Lake and Peninsula Borough, Alaska
Mountains of Alaska
Pleistocene stratovolcanoes
Holocene stratovolcanoes